Natalia Rodríguez Gallego (born 11 December 1982) better known as Natalia is a Spanish singer. She was a contestant on the successful Spanish TV show Operación Triunfo in 2001, where she finished 13th.

In 2002, she released her album No soy un ángel (I'm Not an Angel), produced by British dance producers Xenomania and the first single off the album, Vas a volverme loca, a cover version of Charlotte Nielsen's hit "You Got Me Going Crazy".

In 2003, Natalia released Besa mi piel (Kiss My Skin). On this album, she included 4 of her own compositions (including the first single, also called 'Besa Mi Piel').

In 2004, she released Natalia, her third album. The first single was track penned by Lucie Silvas called Sombras (Shadows). The video (which featured Natalia in a haunted house being seduced by a ghost) was regarded as too inappropriate for young children and wasn't shown on Spanish TV until the late evening, which caused a flop in sales. Amid this, the second single, Que No Puede Ser (No, It Can't Be), became a lot more successful than the first single, due to another expensive video (this time, based on the film Mean Girls) and a big promotional tour across Spain, where Natalia sang live on many important TV shows. This album, however, was mainly based on rock music. It included a version of AC/DC's Highway to Hell.

Natalia has appeared on many other artists albums. In 2004, she appeared on an album by Spanish singer Tony Aguilar on a song called Vuelve. With addition to this, Natalia has appeared on American rapper AT's album Electric Grease with the song “I Love This Game”.

Natalia took a break for a year. However, in September 2005, she made her comeback. First of all, she came first in the Spanish reality TV program Gente de Primera, where celebrities take a member of the public and transform them into pop stars.

In June 2006, Natalia released her fourth album, Nada es lo que crees (Nothing's What You Think). It got to number No.9, four places lower than 'Natalia'. The first single, “Loco por mí” (Mad About Me), got to No.1 in the Spanish chart, solely on Internet Downloads. In January 2007, half a year after the first single was released, it was announced that the second single would be A Tí (To You). However, without a promotional video, it did not make the Spanish chart.

In November 2007, Natalia returned with a new album, Radikal, and a new single, Rebelde en Libertad. Radikal debuted in the Spanish charts at 56.

Discography

Albums

Singles 
 All regularly Singles and their chart peak position: Spain (SPA), United Kingdom (UK), Dominican Republic (DR).

Videography
 Vas a volverme loca (2002)
 La noche llegó (2002)
 No soy un ángel (2002)
 Besa mi piel (2003)
 Sólo tu amor (2003)
 Sombras (2004)
 Que no puede ser (2004)
 I love this game"(feat Lexter) (2005)
 Loco por mi (2006)
 Orden de desalojo (2007)
 Rebelde en libertad (2007)

Filmography

 OT: La película (2002)
 Arde la calle (2005)
 Nocturna (2007) - voice
 El Arca de Noé (2007) - voice

Trivia 
 Although she was 12th in the first edition of Spain's version of Fame Academy, Operación Triunfo, she was: the first contestant to receive a record deal, first to release 2, 3 then 4 albums and first to have a single in a non-Spanish speaking country (one week before David Bisbal released his debut in Germany), a duet with Joanne Zimmer.
 In May 2005, the video of I Love This Game got premiered on CD:UK, a British music program on ITV.
 In November 2012 Natalia made her international debut at a private Gala function for Action Care a humanitarian focused company in Dubai. The prominent multicultural audience greatly enjoyed Natalia's lively  performance. As well she debuted her new heart touching song "Find My Own Way".
 She was one of the Spanish national Jury at the Eurovision Song Contest 2017 held at Kyiv, Ukraine.

See also 
Operación Triunfo

References

External links 

 Natalia Official Website
 Natalia Tour 2007
 MySpace
Natalia Interview With Kiwibox.com

1982 births
Living people
People from Sanlúcar de Barrameda
Singers from Andalusia
21st-century Spanish singers
21st-century Spanish women singers